D313 is a state road in Slavonia region of Croatia connecting the town of Nova Gradiška to the D51 road near Rešetari to north of the A3 motorway.

The road, as well as all other state roads in Croatia, is managed and maintained by Hrvatske ceste, state owned company.

Road junctions and populated areas

Sources

See also
 A3 motorway

State roads in Croatia
Brod-Posavina County